New York's 28th State Assembly district is one of the 150 districts in the New York State Assembly. It has been represented by Democrat Andrew Hevesi since 2005.

Geography
The district is composed of Forest Hills, Rego Park, Middle Village, and parts of Glendale and Ridgewood.

Recent election results

2022

2020

2018

2016

2014

2012

2010

References 

Forest Hills, Queens
Elmhurst, Queens
Maspeth, Queens
28
Queens, New York